Tachina tricolor is a species of fly in the genus Tachina of the family Tachinidae that is endemic to Himachal Pradesh, a province of India.

References

Insects described in 1909
Diptera of Asia
Endemic fauna of Himachal Pradesh
tricolor